Sandra Faleiro (born 1 September, 1972) is a Portuguese actress. Her film acting credits include the films The Domain, Um Dia Longo and Technoboss and her television credits include A Impostora and as the titular character in Madre Paula.

References

External links

1972 births
Living people
Portuguese film actresses
Portuguese television actresses
Sophia Award winners